Dietze is a surname. People with that name include:

Constantin von Dietze (1891-1973), agronomist, lawyer, economist, and theologian
Elke Dietze, West German slalom canoeist who competed at the international level in 1979
Julia Dietze (born 1981), German actress
Jürgen Dietze (born 1942), German swimmer
Mike Dietze (born 1989), American soccer player
Otto Dietze (1833-1890), German-born architect
Tina Dietze (born 1988), German sprint canoer

Surnames of German origin
Surnames from given names